James A. Romanelli (July 8, 1929 – October 16, 1988) is a former Democratic member of the Pennsylvania House of Representatives and the Pennsylvania State Senate.

A native of the South Side, Romanelli worked as a Pittsburgh city building inspector prior to elective office. He represented the 22nd legislative district in the Pennsylvania House of Representatives from 1973 through 1975. He was elected to represent the 43rd senatorial district in the Pennsylvania Senate in a 1975 special election. In 1982, he moved to Squirrel Hill in order to accommodate his mother and mother in law, who had moved in with him and his wife. In 1983, he suffered a mild stroke. He apologized after telling steelworkers at a Labor Day parade in Homestead that they should slash the tires on foreign cars.

References

1988 deaths
Democratic Party members of the Pennsylvania House of Representatives
Politicians from Pittsburgh
Democratic Party Pennsylvania state senators
1929 births
20th-century American politicians